Pollack is an impact crater in the Sinus Sabaeus quadrangle of Mars, located at 7.9° S and 334.8° W. It measures 96 kilometers in diameter and was named after James B. Pollack, an American astrophysicist (1938–1994).
 Pollack Crater contains a large light toned deposit that was once thought to be a salt deposit.  However, the surrounding rocks are exceptionally dark and that makes this deposit appear white.

Cream coloured formation 

Much of Earth's land surface is just a few hundred million years old.  In contrast, large areas of Mars are billions of years old. Some surface areas have been formed, eroded away, then covered over with new layers of rocks. Scientists believe that it used to have a dynamic surface, but then volcanic activity ceased and the atmosphere was stripped away. The Mariner 9 spacecraft in the 1970s photographed a feature that was called "White Rock."  It was thought that this feature could have been a salt deposit, but information from the instruments on Mars Global Surveyor demonstrated rather that it was probably volcanic ash or dust.  Today, it is believed that White Rock represents an old rock layer that once filled the whole crater that it's in, but today it has since been mostly been eroded away.  The picture below shows white rock with a spot of the same rock some distance from the main deposit, so it is thought that the white material once covered a far larger area.

See also 
 List of craters on Mars

References

External links 

 Malin Space Science Systems: "White Rock" of Pollack Crater
 THEMIS Visible light image of the rocks (Released 6 May 2005) (another version)
 ESA Mars Express: Pollack crater deposit, Terra Sabaea (Gallery)
 Image series:
 White rock in Pollack crater: Mariner 9 (1971-1972)
 White rock in Pollack crater: Viking (1976-1980)
 White rock in Pollack crater: Mars Global Surveyor (1997-2006)
 White rock in Pollack crater: 2001 Mars Odyssey (2001-present)
 White rock in Pollack crater: Mars Express (2004-present)
 White rock in Pollack crater:  Mars Reconnaissance Orbiter (2006-present)

Articles

Sinus Sabaeus quadrangle
Impact craters on Mars